K. T. Achaya (6 October 1923 – 5 September 2002) was an oil chemist, food scientist, nutritionist and food historian. 

He is the author of Indian Food: A Historical Companion, The Food Industries of British India, and A Historical Dictionary of Indian Food.

Early life and education 
K. T. Achaya was born in on 6 October 1923 in Kollegal, in the Madras Presidency, (now part of Karnataka). After graduating from University of Madras in 1943, he worked in the Indian Institute of Science for the next three years. He did his PhD work in T. P. Hilditch's lab at the University of Liverpool in United Kingdom.

Career 
He researched on cottonseed processing and castor oil derivatives in Regional Research Laboratory in Hyderabad for 22 years starting from 1950. During this time, he published 150 publications and acquired 11 patents. In 1971, he became the Executive Director of Protein Foods and Nutrition Development Association of India in Mumbai. In 1977, Achaya moved to the Central Food Technological Research Institute (CFTRI), Mysore as Consultant to the United Nations University (UNU) Programme for advanced training in Food Science and Technology for fellows from developing countries. He retired from CFTRI in 1983 and wrote several books after his retirement.

Books 
K. T. Achaya published several books on oil milling and food history of India. 
Oilseeds and Oil Milling in India: A Cultural and Historical Survey (1990), 
GHANI: The Traditional Oil Mill of India (1993)
The Food Industries of British India (1994)
The Story of our Food (2000)
The Food Industries of British India (Oxford University Press, 1994)
Indian Food: A Historical Companion (Oxford University Press, 1994)
A Historical Dictionary of Indian food (Oxford University Press, 1998)
The Illustrated Foods of India, A-Z  (Oxford University Press, 2009)

References 

1923 births
2002 deaths
Indian food writers
Indian food scientists
Food historians
People from Chamarajanagar district
Writers from Karnataka
Scientists from Karnataka
20th-century Indian chemists